Bennett Building may refer to:
Bennett Building (Council Bluffs, Iowa)
Bennett Building (New York City)

See also
Bennett House (disambiguation)
Sue Bennett Memorial School Building, a National Register of Historic Places listing in Laurel County, Kentucky